Javadiyeh-ye Bugar (also Romanized as Javādīyeh-ye Būgar; also known as Javādīyeh) is a village in Dezhkord Rural District, Sedeh District, Eqlid County, Fars Province, Iran. At the 2006 census, its population was 276, in 57 families.

References 

Populated places in Eqlid County